Bykivnia Forest is an urban forest consisting mostly of pine trees (90%), and stretching on the eastern side of Kyiv from the National Park Zalissia in southern direction towards Bortnychi, creating a green belt. It is primarily associated with the Memorial Park Bykivnia Graves, which is located within it. 

On 19th century maps, the western outskirts of Bykivnia Forest show that it once reached the Dnieper. It has since then lost almost half of its original area, as such as Lisovyi Masyv residential neighbourhoods were built in Kyiv during 1970s.

The forest containsa number of lakes and ponds, such as Lake Almazne, Lake Berizka, and ponds that once formed part of the fishery of a Soviet farm, a flooded sand quarry. Through the forest flow rivers Darnytsia and Prirva. Portion of the woodland also contains some peat fields. Within the forest, there is a bird farm. On the edge of the forest are located one of the Kyiv's combined heat and power station and Darnytsia Industrial Park that includes an abandoned chemical factory, railcar repair factory, and an armoured tank factory.

References

Geography of Kyiv
Tourist attractions in Kyiv
Forests of Ukraine